John P. Madgett Station is a base load, coal fired, electrical power station located in Alma, Wisconsin in Buffalo County. Owned by Dairyland Power Cooperative, the John P. Madgett Station and Alma Station are part of its "Alma site".

See also

List of power stations in Wisconsin

References

External links
Alma Site - Dairyland Power Cooperative
Alma Site brochure
Alma Station
John P. Madgett Station

Energy infrastructure completed in 1979
Buildings and structures in Buffalo County, Wisconsin
Coal-fired power stations in Wisconsin